Quinton Mark Quayle (born 5 June 1955) is a retired British Diplomat.

Early life, education and early career
Educated at Bromsgrove School, Humphry Davy School and University of Bristol, Quayle entered the Foreign Office in 1977 and studied Thai at the School of Oriental and African Studies, University of London.  As a junior diplomat, Quayle studied at Chiang Mai University.

Diplomatic career 
Before being sent to Romania, Quayle's previous Diplomatic Service postings included:
 Bangkok, Thailand (Second Secretary, Political)
 Paris, France (First Secretary, Political)
 Jakarta, Indonesia (Deputy Head of Mission)
Quayle served as British Ambassador to Romania from 2002 until 2006, after which he was concurrently appointed as Her Majesty's Ambassador to the Kingdom of Thailand and (non-resident) Ambassador to the Lao People's Democratic Republic. He took up this post in August 2007, succeeding David Fall, and was replaced in November 2010 by Asif Ahmad.

Quayle spent a lot of time in his roles as Ambassador promoting trade and investment and worked very closely with the British Chamber of Commerce in Thailand (BCCT); his job directly before his posting to Bucharest was as International Group Director with UK Trade and Investment.

Other work
He has also worked in the private sector for Price Waterhouse Management Consultants and VT Group. From 2011 to 2016, he served on the boards of the Institute of Chartered Accountants of Scotland, the Royal Institution of Chartered Surveyors and the Nursing and Midwifery Council.  He also acted as Senior Adviser to De La Rue, Salamander Energy (now Medco Energi Global) in this period. He served as a lay member of the Queen's Counsel Appointments Panel and as a Non-Executive Director of 2gether NHS Foundation Trust until 2018. He was on the Governing Council of the Council for Licensed Conveyancers until 2020. Current international roles include serving as Advisor to the President and CEO of Thai Beverages, and Senior Advisor to Prudential and Sindicatum Sustainable Resources in Thailand. In the UK, he currently serves as Chair/Panel Member of the High Speed 2 (HS2) "Need to Sell" Panel, board member of Cottsway Housing Association, Public Interest Council member of the Chartered Institute of Taxation and Independent Commissioner at the Data and Marketing Commission.

Personal life
He is married to Alison Quayle, a professional translator, and has two sons, Christopher and Alexander. His father was Eric Quayle, a  British writer, collector, and historian.

References

Offices held

External links 
UK in Thailand, Foreign & Commonwealth Office - Our ambassador

1955 births
Living people
Members of HM Diplomatic Service
People educated at Bromsgrove School
People educated at Humphry Davy Grammar School for Boys
Alumni of SOAS University of London
Ambassadors of the United Kingdom to Romania
Ambassadors of the United Kingdom to Thailand
Ambassadors of the United Kingdom to Laos
20th-century British diplomats
21st-century British diplomats